Braulio Nóbrega Rodríguez (born 18 September 1985), known simply as Braulio, is a Spanish professional footballer who plays as a forward.

Club career
Braulio was born in Puerto del Rosario, Canary Islands. Having grown through the youth system of Atlético Madrid, he played 11 La Liga games for the Colchoneros between 2004 and 2006 (ten being in his debut season) before being loaned to RCD Mallorca in January 2006 and second division's UD Salamanca in 2006–07, finishing the campaign as the latter team's top scorer.

Braulio was loaned again in 2007–08, this time to Madrid-based Getafe CF, where he teamed up again with Manu del Moral who had played with him in Atlético's youth squads. On 25 October 2007 he scored through a backheel in a 2–1 win over Tottenham Hotspur at White Hart Lane in the group stage of the UEFA Cup. He also netted his team's third and final goal in the competition's quarter-final second leg match against FC Bayern Munich, capitalising on a defensive mistake by Lúcio in the box and proceeding to put the ball past Oliver Kahn in a 3–3 home draw (4–4 aggregate loss).

On 28 June 2008, Braulio signed a four-year contract with Real Zaragoza, recently relegated to the second tier. He was relatively used as the Aragonese were immediately promoted to the top flight, but then suffered an injury which sidelined him for several months. Upon return in late 2009 he found himself without room in the first team and, on 23 January 2010, was loaned to Recreativo de Huelva, as another forward, Adrián Colunga, moved on loan in the opposite direction.

In January 2012, after being released by Zaragoza and sorting out his legal problems, Braulio joined FC Cartagena of division two. He scored six goals in only four and a half months, not enough however to help the Murcian team avoid relegation. In July he joined another club in that league, Hércules CF.

In summer 2014, after an unassuming spell in Malaysia, Braulio signed with Millonarios FC, being released shortly after and taking the Colombian club to court. The same situation occurred with another side in the country, Patriotas FC, but an amicable settlement was reached.

Braulio spent the 2014–15 season with Recreativo de Huelva, failing to score in 25 competitive appearances and also suffering relegation. On 4 January 2016, after a trial, he joined AEL Kalloni F.C. from the Super League Greece until June.

On 7 September 2016, Braulio returned to his country after signing with Caudal Deportivo of the third division. The following 7 August, he agreed to a one-year contract at Indian Super League club Bengaluru FC, being released in February 2018 due to injury and replaced by countryman Daniel Lucas.

Personal life
On 21 September 2011, Braulio was arrested on a charge of sexual assault, which occurred in a town near Zaragoza – Cuarte de Huerva – shortly before Real Zaragoza's morning training. He was not incarcerated immediately, and the following day pleaded guilty, being ousted from the squad until the situation was cleared and released by the club the following month.

Braulio changed his plea to "not guilty" on 18 October 2011, citing poor advice as the reason for this sudden change. Finally, on 22 June of the following year, he avoided a prison sentence and reached an agreement to pay €11,400 in damages.

Career statistics

References

External links

1985 births
Living people
People from Fuerteventura
Sportspeople from the Province of Las Palmas
Spanish footballers
Footballers from the Canary Islands
Association football forwards
La Liga players
Segunda División players
Segunda División B players
Atlético Madrid B players
Atlético Madrid footballers
RCD Mallorca players
UD Salamanca players
Getafe CF footballers
Real Zaragoza players
Recreativo de Huelva players
FC Cartagena footballers
Hércules CF players
Caudal Deportivo footballers
CD Alcoyano footballers
Johor Darul Ta'zim F.C. players
Super League Greece players
AEL Kalloni F.C. players
Cypriot First Division players
Doxa Katokopias FC players
Indian Super League players
Bengaluru FC players
Spain youth international footballers
Spanish expatriate footballers
Expatriate footballers in Malaysia
Expatriate footballers in Greece
Expatriate footballers in Cyprus
Expatriate footballers in India
Spanish expatriate sportspeople in Malaysia
Spanish expatriate sportspeople in Greece
Spanish expatriate sportspeople in Cyprus
Spanish expatriate sportspeople in India